Ay Fond Kiss is the second and final studio album released by British group Fairground Attraction. It was released on 18 June 1990. The title is a misspelling of the Robert Burns poem "Ae Fond Kiss", which lead singer Eddi Reader also covered on her 2003 album Sings the Songs of Robert Burns. The album consists mostly of unreleased recordings and B-sides to previously released singles. The album was also released after Reader had left the group. It peaked at number 55 in the UK Albums Chart.

The album features cover versions of several songs, including Sam Cooke's "You Send Me" (which was previously released as the B-side to the group's hit single "Find My Love"), Donny Hathaway's "Tryin Times", Patsy Cline's "Walkin' After Midnight" and The Beatles "Do You Want to Know a Secret?" as well as Robert Burns "Ae Fond Kiss" and a few other traditional songs.

The only single to be released from the album was "Walkin' After Midnight". It peaked at number 97 on the UK Singles Chart.

Background
Lead guitarist Mark E. Nevin has said of the album:

"On each of the Fairground Attraction singles we recorded 3 extra tracks as 'B-sides'. We felt that it was good value for money and also a good opportunity to record songs that we may not have put on albums.

'Ay Fond Kiss' is basically these b-sides, a live version of 'Allelujah' and the previously unreleased 'Cajun Band', a song written by our friend Anthony Thistlethwaite that we had recorded for a bit of fun during the 'First of a Million Kisses' sessions. We had wanted it to be a budget-priced album and clearly sold as that, but when we split up RCA put it out at full price with no indication that it wasn't in fact a 'proper' album (sneaky).

So if you bought this album thinking it was the follow up to 'First of a Million Kisses' and were a bit disappointed then I apologise. That said, it is still a half decent record and has some really great moments, not least the title track. Eddi always had a great love and knowledge of traditional folk music and her rendition of Robbie Burns' 'Ay Fond Kiss' is worth the price of the album itself in my book. We recorded it in one take at Westside Studios in Hammersmith for inclusion on the 'Find My Love' cd single."

Personnel

Musicians
Eddi Reader - vocals
Roy Dodds - drums
Mark E. Nevin - guitar
Simon Edwards - guitarrón

Production
Mixed By – Kevin Moloney (tracks: 1 to 8, 10)
Producer – Fairground Attraction, Kevin Moloney
Recorded By, Mixed By – Mike Thornton (2) (tracks: 9)

Track listing
"Jock O'Hazeldean" (Traditional)
"The Game of Love" (Mark E Nevin)
"Walkin' After Midnight" (Alan Block / Don Hecht; Patsy Cline cover)
"You Send Me" (Sam Cooke)
"Tryin' Times" (Donny Hathaway / Leroy Hutson)
"Mystery Train" (Junior Parker)
"Winter Rose" (Nevin)
"Do You Want to Know a Secret" (John Lennon / Paul McCartney)
"Allelujah" (Nevin)
"Cajun Band" (Anthony Thistlethwaite)
"Watching the Party" (Nevin)
"Ay Fond Kiss" (Robert Burns poem)

Charts

References

External links
Discogs.com

1990 albums
Fairground Attraction albums
RCA Records albums